The Victims of Chișinău Pogrom Monument is a memorial stone to the victims of Chișinău pogrom, unveiled 1993 in Alunelul park Chișinău, Moldova. It consists of two marble blocks, one in 1993 and one in 2003.

Chișinău Pogrom

The Chișinău pogroms (more commonly known as the Kishinev pogroms) took place in 1903 and 1905. The victims were buried in the Jewish cemetery, but in 1959, this part of the cemetery was destroyed to make way for a park facing Calea Ieșilor Street.

Creation history
The initial monument was erected in 1993, on the 90th anniversary of the pogrom. This memorial stone is divided into two parts by a Star of David. There is an inscription in four languages (Hebrew, Yiddish, Romanian, and Russian), that says: "In memory of the victims of the Kishinev pogrom 1903–1993."

In 2003, on the 100th anniversary, 16 blocks of gray granite were added.  The inscription says: “We will bear your memory in pain forever and you will always be in our hearts.”

Gallery

References

External links
 

Culture in Chișinău
Tourist attractions in Moldova
Outdoor sculptures in Moldova
2013 in Romania
2003 sculptures
Buildings and structures completed in 2003
Marble sculptures
Buildings and structures in Chișinău
Kishinev pogrom